Aleksey Viktorovich Chudinov (28 May 1972 – 1997) was a Soviet and Russian boxer. He competed in the men's heavyweight event at the 1992 Summer Olympics.

Biography
Chudinov took up boxing at the age of 12. He was killed during a criminal altercation at his hometown of Podolsk in 1997. The city of Podolsk hosts an annual a boxing memorial tournament dedicated to Chudinov.

References

External links
 

1972 births
1997 deaths
Soviet male boxers
Russian murder victims
Olympic boxers of the Unified Team
Boxers at the 1992 Summer Olympics
Place of birth missing
Heavyweight boxers
People from Podolsk